Antonio Robert Daniels (born March 19, 1975) is an American former professional basketball player who played 13 seasons in the National Basketball Association (NBA).  He is currently the television color analyst for the New Orleans Pelicans on Bally Sports New Orleans and co-host/analyst on SiriusXM NBA Radio.

College career
He played college basketball at Bowling Green from 1994 to 1997. In 1994, he was named MAC freshman of the Year. In 1997, he was named MAC Player of the Year helping the Falcons to the MAC regular-season championship. He finished his career second on the Bowling Green career scoring chart with 1,789 points, ranking 10th in MAC history at the time.

Professional career
After playing college basketball at Bowling Green, Daniels was selected by the Vancouver Grizzlies with the fourth overall pick of the 1997 NBA draft. On June 24, 1998, he was traded to the San Antonio Spurs in exchange for rookie Felipe López and Carl Herrera. He helped the Spurs win an NBA championship in 1999. On August 5, 2002, Daniels along with Spurs teammates Charles Smith and Amal McCaskill was traded to the Portland Trail Blazers in exchange for Erick Barkley, Steve Kerr, and a conditional second-round pick in the 2003 NBA draft. He later signed as a free agent with the Seattle SuperSonics. After his run with the Sonics had come to an end, he signed with the Washington Wizards.

He was sent to the New Orleans Hornets in a three-team trade with the Washington Wizards and the Memphis Grizzlies on December 10, 2008.

On September 9, 2009, he was traded to the Minnesota Timberwolves along with a 2014 second round pick in exchange for Bobby Brown and Darius Songaila. On September 24, 2009, Daniels agreed to a contract buyout.

On November 1, 2010 Daniels was selected by the Texas Legends of the NBA Development League in the second round (pick 13) of the 2010 NBA Development League Draft.

On April 5, 2011, Daniels was signed to a 10-day contract by the Philadelphia 76ers. He returned to Texas Legends for the next season.

Post-playing career
On October 22, 2015, Daniels was named as an analyst for Fox Sports Oklahoma covering the Oklahoma City Thunder games.

On June 27, 2019, Daniels was named the television color analyst for Fox Sports New Orleans covering the New Orleans Pelicans alongside Joel Meyers.

NBA career statistics

Regular season

|-
| align="left" | 
| align="left" | Vancouver
| 74 || 50 || 26.4 || .416 || .212 || .659 || 1.9 || 4.5 || .7 || .1 || 7.8
|-
| style="text-align:left;background:#afe6ba;"| †
| align="left" | San Antonio
| 47 || 0 || 13.1 || .454 || .294 || .754 || 1.1 || 2.3 || .6 || .1 || 4.7
|-
| align="left" | 
| align="left" | San Antonio
| 68 || 1 || 17.6 || .474 || .333 || .713 || 1.3 || 2.6 || .8 || .1 || 6.2
|-
| align="left" | 
| align="left" | San Antonio
| 79 || 23 || 26.1 || .468 || .404 || .776 || 2.1 || 3.8 || .8 || .2 || 9.4
|-
| align="left" | 
| align="left" | San Antonio
| 82 || 13 || 26.5 || .440 || .291 || .752 || 2.1 || 2.8 || .6 || .1 || 9.2
|-
| align="left" | 
| align="left" | Portland
| 67 || 2 || 13.0 || .452 || .305 || .855 || 1.1 || 1.3 || .5 || .1 || 3.7
|-
| align="left" | 
| align="left" | Seattle
| 71 || 32 || 21.3 || .470 || .362 || .842 || 2.0 || 4.2 || .6 || .1 || 8.0
|-
| align="left" | 
| align="left" | Seattle
| 75 || 2 || 27.0 || .438 || .297 || .816 || 2.3 || 4.1 || .7 || .0 || 11.2
|-
| align="left" | 
| align="left" | Washington
| 80 || 17 || 28.5 || .418 || .228 || .845 || 2.2 || 3.6 || .7 || .1 || 9.6
|-
| align="left" | 
| align="left" | Washington
| 80 || 8 || 22.0 || .442 || .302 || .832 || 1.9 || 3.6 || .5 || .1 || 7.1
|-
| align="left" | 
| align="left" | Washington
| 71 || 63 || 30.4 || .459 || .230 || .776 || 2.9 || 4.8 || 1.0 || .0 || 8.4
|-
| align="left" | 
| align="left" | Washington
| 13 || 5 || 22.2 || .400 || .455 || .758 || 1.7 || 3.6 || .5 || .0 || 5.1
|-
| align="left" | 
| align="left" | New Orleans
| 61 || 4 || 12.0 || .424 || .347 || .821 || .9 || 2.1 || .3 || .0 || 3.8
|-
| align="left" | 
| align="left" | Philadelphia
| 4 || 0 || 8.8 || .400 || .000 || 1.000 || 1.3 || .5 || .0 || .0 || 1.5
|- class="sortbottom"
| style="text-align:center;" colspan="2"| Career
| 872 || 220 || 22.6 || .444 || .311 || .793 || 1.8 || 3.4 || .6 || .1 || 7.6

Playoffs

|-
| style="text-align:left;background:#afe6ba;"| 1999†
| align="left" | San Antonio
| 15 || 0 || 7.1 || .429 || .667 || .833 || .7 || 1.1 || .3 || .0 || 1.8
|-
| align="left" | 2000
| align="left" | San Antonio
| 4 || 0 || 20.5 || .391 || .250 || .692 || 2.5 || 1.5 || 1.8 || .0 || 7.3
|-
| align="left" | 2001
| align="left" | San Antonio
| 13 || 8 || 31.2 || .481 || .370 || .943 || 2.0 || 2.9 || .5 || .1 || 13.5
|-
| align="left" | 2002
| align="left" | San Antonio
| 10 || 0 || 22.4 || .455 || .375 || .864 || 2.7 || 1.5 || .7 || .3 || 9.5
|-
| align="left" | 2003
| align="left" | Portland
| 6 || 1 || 16.3 || .474 || .600 || .500 || 1.3 || 2.0 || .2 || .2 || 3.7
|-
| align="left" | 2005
| align="left" | Seattle
| 11 || 3 || 30.1 || .468 || .286 || .857 || 2.8 || 4.5 || 1.0 || .0 || 13.8
|-
| align="left" | 2006
| align="left" | Washington
| 6 || 0 || 36.0 || .538 || .273 || .909 || 2.8 || 3.3 || .5 || .2 || 13.2
|-
| align="left" | 2007
| align="left" | Washington
| 4 || 4 || 44.0 || .447 || .200 || .857 || 4.5 || 11.8 || 1.3 || .3 || 13.3
|-
| align="left" | 2008
| align="left" | Washington
| 6 || 4 || 25.7 || .452 || .250 || .882 || 2.3 || 3.0 || .3 || .3 || 7.3
|-
| align="left" | 2009
| align="left" | New Orleans
| 5 || 0 || 12.8 || .154 || .250 || .818 || .6 || 1.8 || .4 || .2 || 2.8
|- class="sortbottom"
| style="text-align:center;" colspan="2"| Career
| 80 || 20 || 23.2 || .461 || .353 || .863 || 2.1 || 2.9 || .6 || .1 || 8.6

References

External links
 

1975 births
Living people
20th-century African-American sportspeople
21st-century African-American sportspeople
African-American basketball players
American expatriate basketball people in Canada
American men's basketball players
Basketball players from Columbus, Ohio
Bowling Green Falcons men's basketball players
New Orleans Hornets players
Philadelphia 76ers players
Point guards
Portland Trail Blazers players
San Antonio Spurs players
Seattle SuperSonics players
Texas Legends players
Vancouver Grizzlies draft picks
Vancouver Grizzlies players
Washington Wizards players